Reason to Believe is an album by Canadian singer Rita MacNeil, released in 1988. From the album, the track "Working Man" became an international hit single, reaching number 11 in the UK Singles Chart in 1990 and number 59 in Australia in 1991.

Track listing 
All tracks written by Rita MacNeil.

Charts

Certifications

References

1988 albums
Rita MacNeil albums
Virgin Records albums
Polydor Records albums
A&M Records albums